Tomáš Bartek (born 24 February 1958 in Gottwaldov) is a Czech former handball player who competed in the 1988 Summer Olympics.

References

1958 births
Living people
Czechoslovak male handball players
Czech male handball players
Olympic handball players of Czechoslovakia
Handball players at the 1988 Summer Olympics
Sportspeople from Zlín